The following works of fiction are based in the 14th century:

Drama
Gordon Daviot – Richard of Bordeaux 
William Shakespeare – Richard II

Historical novels
Arthur Conan Doyle
Sir Nigel
The White Company
Umberto Eco – The Name of the Rose
Ismail Kadare - The Three-Arched Bridge (Ura Me Tri Harqe)
Anya Seton – Katherine
Nigel Tranter
Robert the Bruce trilogy
Flowers of Chivalry
Courting Favour
Lords of Misrule
Ronald Welch - Bowman of Crécy

Science fiction novels
Poul Anderson – The High Crusade – Sir Roger, Baron de Tourneville, captures a scouting craft for the Wersgorix Empire in 1345.  His force and the village of Ansby are then taken to the Empire.
Marianne Curley – The Named
Daphne du Maurier – The House on the Strand – A scientist travels back in time to the 14th century.
Michael Crichton – Timeline – A group of historians travels to 14th-century France.

References